The Rahbani brothers (Arabic: الأخوان رحباني), Assi Rahbani (4 May 1923 – 21 June 1986) and Mansour Rahbani (1925 – 13 January 2009) were Lebanese sibling musicians, composers, songwriters, authors, and playwrights/dramatists, best known for their work with the singer Fairuz, Assi's wife. Their younger brother Elias Rahbani (1938 – 4 January 2021) was also a famous lyricist and composer.

Family tree

History

Early career
Coming originally from Rahbeh, a small town in the north of Lebanon, the Rahbani Brothers were not involved in music aside from the extensive reading that their parents made sure they had. Though Assi and Mansour occasionally helped the local priest in arranging the vocals and instrumentation of their Antiochian Orthodox liturgies, their musical career began when Assi obtained a job at the Near East Radio channel.

While working as police officers in Beirut, Mansour and Assi started at the radio channel as paperboys, dealing with the music sheets and lyrical editing. They eventually composed their own jingle and suggested it to the supervisor at the channel, Halim El Roumi, the father of singer Majida El Roumi. He was impressed with their effort and further encouraged them by paying them for their work and broadcasting it on the channel airwaves. The jingles or pieces were usually broadcast live and the brothers' perfectionism became one of their trademarks as they demanded a lot of time in rehearsal and preparation and efforts from the singers to yield the maximal results.

In 1951, Nouhad Haddad (later known as Fairuz), one of the singers in the channel's chorus, came to the attention of Halim El Roumi. Assi composed her very first song, "Itab" ("Blame").

Halim el-Roumi attended the recording session and asked Assi to compose additional songs for her. Assi and Mansour Rahbani and Fairuz soon became one of the most prominent groups on the Lebanese music scene. The trio released about 50 songs in the following three years and found it more convenient to split from the channel and work on their own without the employment restrictions. The Rahbani Brothers and Fairuz became a musical team.  Both of the Rahbani Brothers composed and both of them wrote lyrics as they always clarified in interviews and as attested by their family members as well as by artists who collaborated and worked with them.
     
In 1953, Assi proposed to Fairuz and the couple was married in 1954.

In 1957, the trio performed for the first time at the Baalbeck International Festival; it was the first time that local Lebanese artists had appeared in the festival.

The 1960s

Fairuz and the Rahbani Bros started building their career based on the numerous songs they recorded and released. Radio and TV became the primary media through which their music was spread. Assi and Mansour also began writing musicals, plays with musical dialogs, and interpretations of patriotic themes that appealed to the Lebanese public.

The musicals mostly focused on village life, the innocence of growing up, the problems of love, parental care, and the mischief of youth. One of them was made into a feature movie, Biyya'el Khawatem (Rings Merchant) directed by Egyptian film director [[Youssef Chahine].

The 1970s

During the 1970s, the trio's combined sales passed the 30 million mark due to the international exposure of their music. The Rahbani Brothers also launched the careers of artists who first worked as backup singers for Fairuz or acted in their musicals; many of them became major forces in the Arab music industry. Georgette Sayegh, Najat Al Saghira, Sabah, Wadih El Safi, Ronza, Fadia Tanb El-Hage, and Huda, Fairuz's younger sister were the most prominent of the Rahbani Brothers' proteges.

Fairuz, Assi, and Mansour were introduced to the Western world during their 1971 tour of the United States. Initially, managers and event-organizers in the US doubted the popularity and drawing power of Fairuz and the Rahbani Brothers. However, after a concert of June 6, 1971 at Carnegie Hall sold out, Fairuz proved that she could be a viable artist abroad. After four months of extensively touring the US, Canada, and Mexico, the trio returned to Beirut where Assi and Mansour started working on the musical Al Mahatta (The Station), and a TV show called Al Mawasem (Seasons) starring Huda.

On September 22, 1972 Assi suffered a brain hemorrhage and was rushed to the hospital. Fans crowded outside the hospital praying for him and lighting candles. After three surgeries, Assi's brain hemorrhage was halted.
Ziad Rahbani, the eldest son of Fairuz and Assi, at age 16, composed music for the song Saaloui n'Nass (The People Asked Me), which pays homage to Assi and talks about his absence and the song was included in the musical Al Mahatta (المحطة), which was being prepped at the time. Three months after suffering the hemorrhage, Assi attended the premiere performance of the musical at the Piccadilly Theatre in Hamra Street. Elias Rahbani, Assi's younger brother, took over the orchestration and musical arrangement for the performance.

Within a year, Assi had returned to composing and writing with his brother. They continued to produce musicals, which became increasingly political in nature. After the Lebanese Civil War erupted, the brothers continued to use political satire and sharp criticism in their plays. In 1977, their musical Petra was shown in both the Muslim western and Christian eastern portions of Beirut.

In 1978, the trio toured Europe and the Gulf nations, including a concert at the Paris Olympia. As a result of this busy schedule, Assi's medical and mental health began to deteriorate. Fairuz and the brothers agreed to end their professional and personal relationship in 1979. Fairuz began to work with a production team helmed by her son, Ziad Rahbani, whilst Assi and Mansour composed for other artists such as Ronza.

The 1980s

Assi and Mansour Rahbani continued to compose musicals for Ronza and Fadia Tanb El-Hage (Ronza's sister). They re-made their musical Al Sha'khs (The Person) which they had first performed with Fairuz in the early-1970s. The songs were re-recorded with Ronza's voice; the production featured a small role played by Rima Rahbani, Fairouz's and Assi's daughter.

On June 26, 1986 Assi Rahbani died after spending several weeks in a coma. The nation went into mourning. He was buried in East Beirut; in order to make way for his funeral procession, the city's warring Muslim and Christian factions declared a cease fire and opened the city's checkpoints.

The 1990s

In the summer of 1998, Fairouz, Mansour Rahbani, Elias Rahbani, and Ziad Rahbani re-staged a number of their old musicals at the Baalbeck International Festival. The sold out shows ended with three new songs composed by Mansour and Elias Rahbani, their first collaboration in almost 25 years. 
At the end of the show, Fairouz sang to Assi: "I came to Baalbeck after 20 years, asking where you are, but no one could tell me. Don't say you are not here, your shadow is still fluttering on these stairs, calling into the echoes..."

Critical interpretation – links to critical articles 

A dearth of artistic-literary criticism exists on the works of the Rahbani Brothers, Ziad Rahbani, and Fairouz. One of the main reasons being their works are seen from a Nationalistic point of view. Proper literary criticism remains to be created most probably in later years. However, one of the most important literary interpretations are found in Nizar Mroueh's "In Lebanese Arabic Music and the Rahbani Musical Theatre".

Articles with a critical interpretation:

In Arabic:

Works

Musical plays
Ayyam al Hassaad (Days of Harvest – 1957)
Al 'Urs fi l'Qarya (The Wedding in the Village – 1959)
Al Ba'albakiya (The Girl from Baalbek – 1961)
Jisr el Amar (Bridge of the Moon – 1962)
 'Awdet el 'Askar (The Return of the Soldiers – 1962)
Al Layl wal Qandil (The Night and the Lantern – 1963)
Biyya'el Khawatem (Rings for Sale – 1964)
Ayyam Fakhreddine (The Days of Fakhreddine – 1966)
Hala wal Malik (Hala and the King – 1967)
Ach Chakhs (The Person – 1968–1969)
Jibal Al Sawwan (Sawwan Mountains – 1969)
Ya'ich Ya'ich (Long Live, Long Live – 1970)
Sah Ennawm (Did you sleep well? – 1970–1971 – 2007–2008)
Nass min Wara'  (People Made out of Paper – 1971–1972)
Natourit al Mafatih (The Guardian of the Keys – 1972)
Al Mahatta (The Station – 1973)
Loulou – 1974
Mais el Reem (The Deer's Meadow – 1975)
Petra – 1977–1978
Elissa – 1979 (Never performed due to the separation of Fairuz and Assi)
Habayeb Zaman – 1979 (Never performed due to the separation of Fairuz and Assi)
Ar-rabih Assabeh (the seventh spring – 1984)
Al Faris (2016)

Films
(1965) Biyya' el Khawatem (" The wedding Rings Seller" )
(1967) Safar Barlek (The Exile)
(1968) Bint El-Hares (The Guardian's Daughter)

See also
Assi Rahbani
Mansour Rahbani
Fairuz
Ziad Rahbani

References

External links

 Elias Rahbani
 

Lebanese musicians
Lebanese writers
Lebanese songwriters
+
Lebanese philosophers
+
20th-century male writers